Geraint Huw Jenkins, FBA, FLSW (born 24 January 1946) is a historian of Wales and a retired academic. He was Professor of Welsh History at the Aberystwyth University (then University College of Wales, Aberystwyth) from 1990 to 1993, when he became Director of the University of Wales Centre for Advanced Welsh and Celtic Studies. In 2009, he retired from academia and was appointed Professor Emeritus of Welsh History at the University of Wales.

Education 
Ysgol Gymraeg Aberystwyth Primary; Ardwyn Grammar Sch., Aberystwyth; UCW, Swansea (BA 1st Cl. Hons 1967; Hon. Fellow, Univ. of Wales Swansea, 2004); UCW, Aberystwyth (PhD 1974); DLitt Wales 1994

Career 
Born on 24 January 1946, Jenkins attended grammar school in Aberystwyth and then completed his undergraduate studies at the University College of Wales, Swansea, in 1967. He then went to the University College of Wales at Aberystwyth to carry out his doctoral studies; his PhD was awarded in 1974. Jenkins lectured at Aberystwyth from 1968; he was promoted to senior lecturer in 1981 and reader in 1988, before being appointed Professor of Welsh History in 1990. In 1993, he was appointed Director of the University of Wales Centre for Advanced Welsh and Celtic Studies, serving until 2008; in 2009, he was appointed Emeritus Professor at the University of Wales. He served on the Board of Celtic Studies at the University of Wales from 1985, and chaired the board from 1993 to 2007.

Jenkins is particularly noted for his contribution to the study of Iolo Morganwg and his work in collating and editing the papers of the latter to enable the publication of A Rattleskull Genius: The Many Faces of Iolo Morganwg (Iolo Morganwg and the Romantic Tradition in Wales (2006). The book has been described as "a scholarly feast", but a reviewer also warned that "...it must run some risk of satiating the appetite it is designed to whet."

Honours 
Jenkins was elected a Fellow of the British Academy in 2002, and was among the founding fellows of the Learned Society of Wales on its inception in 2010. He received a doctor of letters degree from the University of Wales in 1994.

Selected publications 
 The Foundations of Modern Wales: Wales 1642–1780, part of the Oxford History of Wales (Oxford University Press, 1987 & rev. edn 1993).
 (Editor) A Social History of the Welsh Language, 11 vols. (University of Wales Press, 1997–2000).
 (Editor) The Correspondence of Iolo Morganwg 1770–1826, 3 vols. (University of Wales Press, 2007).
 A Concise History of Wales (Cambridge University Press, 2007).
 Cewri’r Bêl-droed yng Nghymru, 1977; Literature, Religion and Society in Wales 1660–1730, 1978
 Thomas Jones yr Almanaciwr, 1980
 Hanes Cymru yn Cyfnod Modern Cynnar, 1983, rev. edn 1988 (Welsh Arts Council Prize, 1989) 
 (ed jtly) Politics and Society in Wales 1840–1922, 1988 
 Llunio Cymru Fodern, 1989
 The Making of Modern Wales, 1989
 Cymru Ddoe a Heddiw, 1990
 Wales Yesterday and Today, 1990
 Cadw Tŷ mewn Cwmwl Tystion, 1990 (Welsh Arts Council Prize, 1991)
 Protestant Dissenters in Wales 1639–1689, 1992
 The Illustrated History of the University of Wales, 1993
 (ed jtly) Merêd: Casgliad o’i Ysgrifau, 1995
 (ed) Y Gymraeg yn ei Disgleirdeb, 1997
 (ed) The Welsh Language before the Industrial Revolution, 1997
 (ed jtly) Cardiganshire in Modern Times, 1998
 (ed) Iaith Carreg fy Aelwyd, 1998
 (ed) Language and Community in the Nineteenth Century, 1998
 (ed) Gwnewch Bopeth yn Gymraeg, 1999
 Doc Tom: Thomas Richards, 1999
 (ed) Welsh and its Social Domains 1801–1911, 2000
 (ed jtly) Eu Hiaith a Gadwant?, 2000
 (ed jtly) Let's Do Our Best for the Ancient Tongue, 2000
 (ed) Cymru a’r Cymry 2000, 2001
 (ed jtly) From Medieval to Modern Wales, 2004
 A Rattleskull Genius: the many faces of Iolo Morganwg, 2005
 (ed jtly) Degrees of Influence, 2008
 Iolo Morganwg y Gweriniaethwr, 2010
 The Swans Go Up, 2011
 Yr Elyrch: Dathlu’r Cant, 2012
 Bard of Liberty: the political radicalism of Iolo Morganwg, 2012
 Proud to be a Swan: the centenary history of Swansea City FC, 2012
 (ed jtly) The Welsh Language in the Twentieth Century, 2015
 Y Digymar Iolo Morganwg, 2018
 (ed jtly) Cardiganshire County History: medieval and early modern Cardiganshire, 2019

References 

1946 births
Living people
People from Penparcau
Historians of Wales
Alumni of Swansea University
Alumni of Aberystwyth University
Academics of Aberystwyth University
Fellows of the British Academy
Fellows of the Learned Society of Wales